Mahmudabad (also Romanized as Maḩmūdābād; also known as Mahmood Abad Afshariyeh) is a village in Hesar-e Valiyeasr Rural District, Central District, Avaj County, Qazvin Province, Iran. At the 2006 census, its population was 267, in 55 families.

References 

Populated places in Avaj County